Emil Marius Eriksen (9 December 1886 – 14 September 1950) was a Norwegian gymnast who competed in the 1912 Summer Olympics. He was born in Barbu, Norway and died in Oslo. He was the father of Marius Eriksen, Jr. and Stein Eriksen and the grandfather of actress/ film director Beate Eriksen. Eriksen was part of the Norwegian gymnastics team, which won the bronze medal in the gymnastics men's team, Swedish system event.

References

External links
profile

1886 births
1950 deaths
Norwegian male artistic gymnasts
Olympic gymnasts of Norway
Gymnasts at the 1912 Summer Olympics
Olympic bronze medalists for Norway
Olympic medalists in gymnastics
Medalists at the 1912 Summer Olympics
People from Aust-Agder
Sportspeople from Agder
20th-century Norwegian people